The Peach County School District is a public school district in Peach County, Georgia, United States, based in Fort Valley. It serves the communities of Byron, Fort Valley, Perry, and Warner Robins.

Schools
The Peach County School District has three elementary schools, two middle schools, and one high school.

Elementary schools
Byron Elementary School
Hunt Elementary School
Kay Road Elementary School
Hunt Primary School - now closed

Middle schools
Byron Middle School
Fort Valley Middle School

High school
Peach County High School

References

External links

School districts in Georgia (U.S. state)
Education in Peach County, Georgia